Ricardo Mier (born 14 January 1952) is a Uruguayan footballer. He played in three matches for the Uruguay national football team in 1975. He was also part of Uruguay's squad for the 1975 Copa América tournament.

References

External links
 

1952 births
Living people
Uruguayan footballers
Uruguay international footballers
Place of birth missing (living people)
Association football defenders
Huracán Buceo players
Club Atlético Vélez Sarsfield footballers
All Boys footballers
Uruguayan expatriate footballers
Expatriate footballers in Argentina